D was a streetcar route in Los Angeles, California. The line was operated by the Los Angeles Railway from 1895 to 1947.

History

Bonnie Brae Line (1895–1920)
During the early days of LARy, the route ("Bonnie Brae") had to compete with multiple other streetcar companies, running a circuitous route to avoid them between Central Station and the northern portion of Westlake, by way of 5th Street, Olive Street, 6th Street, Figueroa Street, 7th Street, Alvarado Street, Webster Avenue, and Bonnie Brae Street.

Following the Great Merger of 1911, Pacific Electric divested most of its Los Angeles local routes to LARy, allowing D to use former Los Angeles Inter-Urban Electric Railway trackage on West 6th street Westlake.

D Line (1920–1947)
In 1921, the Bonnie Brae Line was given the letter designation D. Cars originated at Fifth and Central, running west via Fifth; Olive; Sixth; a private right of way; and Larchmont as far as Melrose. Early in the 1920s, the 5th Street segment was extended so that 3, U, and D lines could run straight along 5th Street through Downtown and shortening the route by an additional . This made D little more than a branch of two much more popular routes. Service to Bonnie Brae was resumed in January 1925.

With the closure of Central Station in 1940, and no major destinations on East 5th Street, ridership downtown reduced significantly (though the removal of the I line improved ridership in Westlake). Ridership along the route spiked in World War II, necessitating extending the service down U line tracks to Slauson. The route was removed by Los Angeles Transit Lines in 1947, largely replaced with trolley coach service.

Sources

External links
 D Line Archives — Pacific Electric Railway Historical Society
 

Los Angeles Railway routes
Railway lines opened in 1920
Railway lines closed in 1947
1920 establishments in California
1947 disestablishments in California